Ixiochlamys is a genus of Australian flowering plants in the family Asteraceae.

 Species
 Ixiochlamys cuneifolia (R.Br.) F.Muell. & Sond. ex F.Muell. & Sond.
 Ixiochlamys filicifolia Dunlop
 Ixiochlamys integerrima Dunlop
 Ixiochlamys nana (Ewart & Jean White) Grau

References

Asteraceae genera
Astereae
Endemic flora of Australia
Taxa named by Otto Wilhelm Sonder
Taxa named by Ferdinand von Mueller